Phytoecia marki is a species of beetle in the family Cerambycidae. It was described by Plavilstshikov in 2008. It is known from Armenia.

References

Phytoecia
Beetles described in 2008